Wuthara Island is a national park in Queensland, Australia. It is located 1,962 km northwest of Brisbane in the Great Barrier Reef Marine Park Queensland, about 40 km North East of Kutini-Payamu National Park and Lockhart River in the Cape Weymouth area in the Coral Sea just off the small locality of Portland Road.

From its founding in 1990 to 2011, the park was named Forbes Islands National Park.

References

See also

 Protected areas of Queensland

National parks of Far North Queensland
Islands of Queensland
Protected areas established in 1990
1990 establishments in Australia
Coral Sea Islands
Great Barrier Reef Marine Park